The following list is of important municipalities in the Castile and León, an autonomous community of Spain:

Provincial lists 
The following links are to lists which are more detailed province-specific, and all municipalities in a given province are ranked by population.

 List of municipalities in Ávila
 List of municipalities in Burgos
 List of municipalities in León
 List of municipalities in Palencia
 List of municipalities in Salamanca
 List of municipalities in Soria
 List of municipalities in Valladolid
 List of municipalities in Zamora

By population

See also 

 Comarcas of Castile and León

References